In category theory and its applications to mathematics, a biproduct of a finite collection of objects, in a category with zero objects, is both a product and a coproduct. In a preadditive category the notions of product and coproduct coincide for finite collections of objects. The biproduct is a generalization of finite direct sums of modules.

Definition

Let C be a category with zero morphisms. Given a finite (possibly empty) collection of objects A1, ..., An in C, their biproduct is an object  in C together with morphisms 

 in C (the projection morphisms)
 (the embedding morphisms)
satisfying
, the zero morphism  for 
and such that
 is a coproduct for the 

If C is preadditive and the first two conditions hold, then each of the last two conditions is equivalent to  when n > 0. An empty, or nullary, product is always a terminal object in the category, and the empty coproduct is always an initial object in the category. Thus an empty, or nullary, biproduct is always a zero object.

Examples

In the category of abelian groups, biproducts always exist and are given by the direct sum. The zero object is the trivial group.

Similarly, biproducts exist in the category of vector spaces over a field. The biproduct is again the direct sum, and the zero object is the trivial vector space.

More generally, biproducts exist in the category of modules over a ring.

On the other hand, biproducts do not exist in the category of groups. Here, the product is the direct product, but the coproduct is the free product.

Also, biproducts do not exist in the category of sets. For, the product is given by the Cartesian product, whereas the coproduct is given by the disjoint union. This category does not have a zero object.

Block matrix algebra relies upon biproducts in categories of matrices.

Properties

If the biproduct  exists for all pairs of objects A and B in the category C, and C has a zero object, then all finite biproducts exist, making C both a Cartesian monoidal category and a co-Cartesian monoidal category.

If the product  and coproduct  both exist for some pair of objects A1, A2 then there is a unique morphism  such that

 for 

It follows that the biproduct  exists if and only if f is an isomorphism.

If C is a preadditive category, then every finite product is a biproduct, and every finite coproduct is a biproduct. For example, if  exists, then there are unique morphisms  such that

 for 

To see that  is now also a coproduct, and hence a biproduct, suppose we have morphisms  for some object .

In this case we always have

An additive category is a preadditive category in which all finite biproducts exist. In particular, biproducts always exist in abelian categories.

References

Additive categories
Limits (category theory)